Ayman Odeh
Masud Ghnaim
Jamal Zahalka
Ahmad Tibi
Aida Touma-Sliman
Abd al-Hakim Hajj Yahya
Haneen Zoabi
Dov Khenin
Taleb Abu Arar
Yosef Jabareen
Basel Ghattas
Osama Saadi
Abdullah Abu Ma'aruf
Juma Azbarga
Said al-Harumi
Ibrahim Hijazi
Youssef Atauna
Wael Younis
Niven Abu Rahmoun
Leah Tsemel
Noah Levy
Samar Samara
Sami Muhanna
Yaala Livnit Raanan
Nimer Hussein
Heba Yazbak
Sondos Saleh
Bashel Darawshe
Safavid Prig
Roeah Abu Rabia
Amgad Shabita
Ashraf Kourtam
Murad Haddad
Ahmed Muhanna
Samar Abu Yunis
Ali Kitnani
Pathi Dakah
Salam Bilal
Kaid Herbos
Elias Assad Atallah
Ghassan Abdullah
Pedro Goldfarb
Saleh Ryan
Mahasen Keyes
Rodinah Jeraisi
Yosef Alkram
Miriam Perach
Gad Jacob Algazi
Ali Srugi
Nasser al-Din Zoabi
Fukra ibd al-Rahim
Razi Issa
Daoud Afan
Walid Kadan
Basel Shadi Abbas
Hatam Waked
Muhammad Masarwa
Gerardo Leibner
Mahmoud Nasser
Suheir Assad
Amar Abu Anam
Saad Jaber
Hanin Al-Ziadnah
Bassam Abu-Yassin
Missam Galgolah
Akil Al-Ziadnah
Efraim Davidi
Khalil Al-Amor
Gad Jihad Saad
Ahmed Frig
Fathia Sagir
Sami Abu-Shehadeh
Edna Zaritsky
Amani Hiadri
Omer Sahsah
Mahmoud Alhoatra
Naadra Kervorkian
Ziad Awida
Ofer Kasif
Hassan Davsan
Elias Khoury
Kaid Al-Kazazi
Salman Natour
Sharif Zoabi
Jiris Mater
Maher Acri
Adel Amer
Wael Jushan
Daliah Bakr
Assad Saman
Said Salameh
Assad Kanana
Edgar Dakwar
Joseph Shaheen
Darawshe Abd al-Salam
Abbas Abbas
Ali Hidar
Michel Warschawski
Sameh Iraqi
Hanna Abu Hanna
Yehouda Shenhav
Nehed Nehed
Amin Anbatawi
Imran Kanana
Amal Murkus Azrik
Afnan Igbarieh
Afu Agbaria
Sabani Majid Ibd Alkad
Hana Sweid
Abdulhalim Taha
Abdulwahab Darawshe
Abdulmalik Dehamshe
Tamar Gozansky
Hashem Mahameed
Muhammad Taha
Mohamed Nafa
Mazen 
Wasil Taha
Ibrahim Sarsur
Mohammad Barakeh

External links
Central Elections Committee Official Joint List List

2015 in Israeli politics
Lists of Israeli politicians
Legislative elections in Israel